Ewell is an unincorporated community located on Smith Island in Somerset County, Maryland, United States.

References

Crabbing communities in Maryland
Fishing communities in Maryland
Unincorporated communities in Somerset County, Maryland
Smith Island, Maryland
Unincorporated communities in Maryland